Line 9 is a rapid transit line of the Tianjin Metro. It spans 52.8 km with 21 stations, connecting the urban area of Tianjin with Binhai New Area, a new area within the jurisdiction of Tianjin Municipality. The one-way journey time is approximately one hour.

Line 9 is run by Tianjin Binhai Mass Transit Development Co., Ltd, which became a subsidiary of Tianjin Rail Transit Group Corporation in 2017.

Design
Most of the line is elevated that runs parallel to the Jinbin Expressway (only the westernmost  runs in tunnels). Hence, it is often wrongly called "light rail", as is commonplace in China with elevated or at-grade metro lines.

Of the 4 bridges along the line, the No. 1 and No. 4 bridges are longer and use ballastless track, while the No. 2 and No. 3 bridges use ballasted track.

History
Line 9 first opened on 28 March 2004.

Train service on the whole line was suspended on 13 August 2015 after a series of massive explosions devastated the area. The explosions occurred less than a kilometre from Donghailu station; the roof of the station collapsed, and the control centre nearby was destroyed. It resumed operation on 16 December from Tianjin Railway Station to Tianjin Pipe Corporation Station.

Timeline 
 2001 May 18 - Construction begins
 2003 September 30 - Construction completes
 2004 March 28 - Trial service begins, 6 stations are open to service: Zhongshanmen, Donglikaifaqu, Gangguangongsi, Yanghuoshichang, Dongtinglu, and Donghailu. The price of the tickets are 3 yuan for less than 30 km or 5 yuan for greater than 30 km. The first train departs at 07:00 and the last at 19:00. Hujiayuan is a special station only open to BMT staffs and Huizhanzhongxin station near TEDA football field is only open for football matches and other special events.
 2004 May 25 - Yihaoqiao station opens for service
 2004 September 13 - Extends open time to 06:30 - 19:00
 2004 October 18 - Shiminguangchang station opens
 2005 March 27 - Huizhanzhongxin station opens on normal days
 2005 April 28 - Erhaoqiao station opens, Yihaoqiao station closes. Automatic ticket selling and checking system begins use. The price of a ticket changes to 2, 3, 4, 5, or 6 yuan, depending on the travel distance. Extends open time to 06:30 - 20:00.
 Late 2005 or early 2006 - Yanghuoshichang station changed name to Tanggu; Dongtinglu changed name to TEDA.
 2006 March 1 - Yihaoqiao station reopens; Xinlizhen, Xiaodongzhuang, Junliangcheng, Hujiayuan stations open, so all 14 stations that have been constructed are open.
 2006 March 28 - At 11 a.m., the trains begin automatic train operation; the total travel time from Zhongshanmen to Donghailu decreases from 49 min to 47.5 min.
 2006 May 1 - Extends open time to 06:30 - 21:00.
 2010 May 1 - Shiyijing Road to Zhongshanmen was opened
 2015 August 12 - the 2015 Tianjin explosions caused significant damage; all operations are suspended.
 2015 December 16 - Tianjin Railway Station to Tianjin Pipe Corp Station section resumes operation. The operation time is 06:00 - 22:30.
 Early 2016 - Tianjin Pipe Corp Station to Citizen Plaza section resumes operation.
 31 December 2016 - Citizen Plaza to Donghai Road section resumes operation.

Chronology of section openings

Stations (west to east)

Service routes:
 Tianjin Railway Station - Donghai Road
 Tianjin Railway Station - Zhigu - Tanggu through train, runs twice per day, one on the morning and another on the night

Rolling stock

Notes

References 

Tianjin Metro lines
Railway lines opened in 2004